Layer Road was a Football League stadium in Colchester, England. It was only used for football matches and was the home ground of Colchester United before being replaced by the Colchester Community Stadium. The stadium held  spectators and was built in 1907, originally for use by Colchester Town Football Club. The ground was also used to host Sudbury Town's FA Cup match against Brentford in 1996, as their Priory Stadium was deemed unfit. One of the unusual features of the ground was at the Layer Road End, where the back of the goal and the netting actually cut back into the stand.

The most recent development to the ground was the construction of a small, temporary seating stand for housing away supporters. It held 143 supporters and was similar to the chocolate boxes at The Dell.

The last first team match at Layer Road took place on 26 April 2008, when Colchester lost 1–0 to Stoke City, with Richard Cresswell scoring the last goal at the stadium.

Just three days after the first team farewell, Layer Road hosted a Pontins Holiday Combination reserve league fixture on Tuesday 29 April 2008 when 471 witnessed Colchester United beat Peterborough United 3-0 in the last competitive game at the ground with the floodlights being used for the final time.

Dulwich Hamlet youth team were invited to a behind closed doors friendly on 11 July 2008 where Colcheter won 7-0 in what became the final game of football ever played at Layer Road. 
The stadium was locked for the last time on 17 July 2008 after 101 years in use (71 of them as the home of Colchester United), being demolished by the end of the year. In 2011 a deal was signed to build flats and houses on the site, with a central open grassed space to reflect its history as a football ground. In mid-2012, Layer Road was demolished with the construction of houses commencing immediately.
In 2015 a bronze statue of Peter Wright (Colchester United's Player of the Century) was unveiled by his widow Lindsey and Sir Bob Russell MP to commemorate Peter Wright, the fact that the site was home to Colchester United for seventy years and the supporters' ashes which had been scattered on the pitch as an expression of their love for the club. The statue was made by local artist Mandy Pratt and cast at Butterfly Bronze Foundry in Romford by Will Hayes

References

External links
Layer Road information Colchester United F.C.

Defunct football venues in England
Colchester United F.C.
Sports venues completed in 1910
Sports venues demolished in 2012
Sports venues in Colchester
Football venues in Essex
Defunct sports venues in Essex
English Football League venues
Demolished sports venues in the United Kingdom